Oncopera fasciculatus, the underground grassgrub, is a moth of the family Hepialidae  endemic to South Australia and Victoria.

References

Hepialidae
Moths described in 1869